Wood River Center Grange No. 87, also known as Wood River Grange, in or near Shoshone, Idaho, was built in 1914.  It was the center of social activity in its area of rural Lincoln County, Idaho.

It was listed on the National Register of Historic Places in 2003.

References

Clubhouses on the National Register of Historic Places in Idaho
Buildings and structures in Lincoln County, Idaho
Grange organizations and buildings
National Register of Historic Places in Lincoln County, Idaho
Grange buildings on the National Register of Historic Places